Kanel is a town in the Matam Region of northeastern Senegal. It is the capital of the Kanel Department. The population in 2012 was 13,331, an increase from the 8,997 counted in 2002.

The town received commune status in 1996. Its climate is typical of the Sahel region

References

Populated places in Matam Region
Communes of Senegal